Jake & the Phatman is an American record production and songwriting duo, composed of multi-instrumentalists Glenn Standridge and Robert C. "Bobby" Ozuna Jr. They won a Grammy Award for Best R&B Song at the 45th Annual Grammy Awards in 2003.

Both were born in the mid 1970s in the San Francisco Bay Area. Their early work included the Luniz, 3X Krazy, Keak da Sneak, Dawn Robinson (formally of En Vogue and Lucy Pearl) and Dr. Dre. In 1997 they started work on what was to become the supergroup Lucy Pearl's debut album, featuring Raphael Saadiq (Tony! Toni! Toné!), Dawn Robinson, and Ali Shaheed (A Tribe Called Quest). It was during this time they developed their working relationship with Raphael Saadiq. After the success of the Lucy Pearl album Raphael Saadiq began to use them exclusively as his production partners. Their production work on Saadiq's debut album Instant Vintage included pressing the vocals onto acetate and then "scratching them into the tracks".

As producers Jake and the Phatman have racked up a long list of credits including Dawn Robinson, Kelis, Mary J. Blige, TLC, Musiq Soulchild, Anthony Hamilton, Ginuwine, Dwele, Angie Stone, Common and John Legend.

Awards and nominations

!
|-
|rowspan="3"| 2002
|"Love of My Life (An Ode to Hip-Hop)"
|rowspan="2"| Grammy Award for Best R&B Song
|
|rowspan="3"| 
|-
|"Be Here"
|
|-
|"Love of My Life (An Ode to Hip-Hop)"
|Grammy Award for Best Song Written for a Motion Picture, Television or Other Visual Media
|
|-

References

External links

American DJs
Living people
Grammy Award winners
American musical duos
Songwriters from California
American multi-instrumentalists
Record producers from California
Year of birth missing (living people)